Pauli Janhonen (20 October 1914 – 30 November 2007) was a Finnish sport shooter. He was born in Jyväskylä. He won a silver medal in 300 metre rifle three positions at the 1948 Summer Olympics in London. He also competed at the 1952 Summer Olympics in Helsinki and at the 1960 Summer Olympics in Rome.

References

External links

1914 births
2007 deaths
Sportspeople from Jyväskylä
People from Vaasa Province (Grand Duchy of Finland)
Finnish male sport shooters
Shooters at the 1948 Summer Olympics
Shooters at the 1952 Summer Olympics
Shooters at the 1960 Summer Olympics
Olympic shooters of Finland
Olympic silver medalists for Finland
Olympic medalists in shooting
Medalists at the 1948 Summer Olympics